Alì is a comune (municipality) in the Metropolitan City of Messina in the Italian region Sicily, located about  east of Palermo and about  southwest of Messina.

Alì borders the following municipalities: Alì Terme, Fiumedinisi, Itala.

References

Cities and towns in Sicily
Articles which contain graphical timelines